The Gang du Petit Bar is a Corsican organized crime group.

It would come from the band of Jean-Jérôme Colonna, practiced extortion at the expense of merchants.

Active in the Greater Ajaccio region but also on the continent and abroad, it is presented in 2022 as the most powerful criminal group in Corsica, the only one having succeeded in creating a network of political and economic influence worthy of a real mafia.

History

Chronology 
May 2007: Four alleged members are arrested; Thirty years old, children of merchants or civil servants, they have no known links with the Corsican separatists. The band owes its name to the "Petit Bar" of Ajaccio, property of Ange-Marie Michelosi, lieutenant of Jean-Jérôme Colonna.
8 July 2008: Ange-Marie Michelosi is assassinated in Grosseto-Prugna (Porticcio).
21 April 2011: Marie-Jeanne Bozzi (ex-mayor of Grosseto-Prugna), sister of Ange-Marie Michelosi, is assassinated.
 3 October 2013: Jacques Santoni, presented as the leader of the gang, is arrested. Suspected of having ordered the assassination of Antoine Nivaggioni in 2010 and Antoine Sollacaro in 2012, as well as an attempted murder against Charles Cervoni, he is on trial in 2018. Jacques Santoni is again mentioned in 2019 as a possible accomplice during the trial of two men accused of the murder of Antoine Nivaggioni; they are condemned respectively to 25 and 10 years of prison without the responsibility of Jacques Santoni having been established.
13 September 2018: Attempted assassination of Guy Orsoni, son of Alain Orsoni and nephew of Guy Orsoni, in Ajaccio.
23 October 2020: Jacques Pastini, Philippe Porri and Jean-Laurent Salasca are sentenced to two years in prison for "complicity in damaging or damaging the property of others by a means dangerous for people" for the fire at Le Globo restaurant on 22 September 2017 in Ajaccio.
28 September 2020: A police operation is organized against the Petit Bar team as part of the investigation into the attempted assassination of Guy Orsoni. Three informed members manage to flee: Pascal Porri, Mickaël Ettori and André Bacchiolelli. Joseph Menconi, suspected of providing logistical assistance in an attempted assassination of Guy Orsoni, was allowed to make a phone call from an investigator's cell phone. Jacques Santoni was indicted on 30 September 2020 for "complicity in homicide in an organized gang" and "criminal association."
10 January 2021: Twenty people were arrested as part of an investigation by JIRS Marseille into the laundering of 48 million euros. Jacques Santoni is indicted and imprisoned.
16 January 2021: A police officer was taken into custody. He was suspected of being the "mole" who informed the gang members of the police operation of 28 September 2020. The police officer was finally released, “without any charges being brought against him”.

Assassination of Antoine Sollacaro 
Members of the gang are suspected in the assassination of the lawyer Antoine Sollacaro, former president of the bar of Ajaccio, defender of the nationalist Yvan Colonna and Alain Orsoni. In April 2013, André Bacchiolelli and Mickaël Ettori were indicted for this assassination and Pascal Porri for "criminal association and concealment of motorcycle theft". These prosecutions were cancelled in 2014 by the Aix-en-Provence investigating chamber, after the retraction of a witness, the mechanic who had identified the three men and the motorcycle used in the murder.

In 2015, Patrick Giovannoni, a former close friend of the gang, told the judge that Jacques Santoni had told him that they were indeed the perpetrators of the crime. Jacques Santoni and André Bacchiolelli are again indicted. The case is still under investigation and the accused benefit from the presumption of innocence.

Attempted assassination of Alain Orsoni (2008) 
Six men close to the Petit Bar gang, including Stéphane Raybier, were sentenced in 2011 by the Marseilles court to prison terms for having wanted to assassinate the former nationalist leader Alain Orsoni in 2008 in Ajaccio.

Attempted assassination of Guy Orsoni (2018) 
This band is suspected of an assassination attempt in September 2018 of Guy Orsoni, son of Alain Orsoni, former leader of the Movement for Self-Determination (MPA), and nephew of Guy Orsoni (assassinated on 17 June 1983).

On September 28, 2020, a wave of arrests took place in Corsica in the context of this case. Jacques Santoni was indicted on September 30, 2020 for "criminal conspiracy to commit a crime". Philippe Porri is also indicted. Two others in custody, François Kay and Ange-Marie Gaffory, were already in detention.

Leaks from the police allow Pascal Porri, Mickaël Ettori and André Bacchiolelli to escape. The magistrates of the JIRS of Marseilles discovered that members of the judicial police of Corsica and the office for the fight against organized crime had left Joseph Menconi (known as "José"), a member of Corsican banditry placed in police custody, phone from the police station to his companion. His phone line had been tapped by JIRS for another case. This incident led to the relinquishment of the Corsican judicial police to the benefit of the gendarmerie in this case and to the departure of several police officers from the Corsican judicial police.

Presumed members 
André Bacchiolelli (known as “Dédé”). Arrested on 5 July 2021 in Ajaccio and indicted on counts of attempted intentional homicide in an organized gang, criminal association and concealment in an organized gang and imprisoned.

References

 
Transnational organized crime
Organized crime groups in France
French Connection